This is a list of notable Iranian singers that have entered the industry, currently working or have left the industry.



A
Arash (1977-)
Ali Reza Eftekhari (1958-)
Azad  (1973-)
Afat (1934-2007)
Adib Khansari (1921-1982)
Afshin (1955-)
Amir Tataloo (1987-)
Andy (1958-)
Ali Pahlavan (1975-)
Azam Ali (1979-)
Afsaneh Rasaei (1974-)
Abdi Behravanfar (1975-)
Amir Hossein Arman (1982-)
Aliasghar Movasat (1975-)
Ali Abdolmaleki (1984-)
Ali Lohrasbi (1976-)
Alireza Talischi (1985-)
Alireza Ghorbani (1973-)

B
Babak Jahanbakhsh (1983-)
Baran (1988-)
Barbad 
Bahram (1983-)
Benyamin Bahadori (1982-)
Behzad Ranjbaran (1955-)
Bijan Kamkar (1965-)
Bijan Mortazavi (1957-)

D
Dariush (1951-)
Davood Azad (1963-)

E
Ebi (1949-)
Ehsan Khajeh Amiri (1984-)
Elaheh (1934-2007)
Erfan (1983-)

F
Farhad Mehrad  (1944-2002)
Faramarz Asef (1977-)
Faramarz Aslani (1954-)
Farzad Farzin (1981-)

G
Googoosh (1950-)
Gholam Hossein Banan (1911-1986)
Gholamali Pouratayi (1944-2014)
Giti Pashaei (1940-1995)

H
Habib (1947-2016)
Hayedeh (1942-1990)
Hassan Zirak (1921-1972)
Homayoun Shajarian (1975-)

I
Iraj (1933-)
Iraj Bastami (1957-2003)
Iraj Rahmanpour (1957-)

K
Khatereh Parvaneh (1930-2008)
Kaveh Afagh (1983-)
Kourosh Yaghmaei (1946-)

L
Leila Forouhar (1959-)
Laleh (1982-)

M
Mahsa Vahdat (1973-)
Majid Akhshabi (1973-)
Mansour (1971-)
Mehdi Yarrahi (1981-)
Moein (1952-)
Mohammad Esfahani (1966-)
Mohammad Reza Shajarian (1940-2020)
Mohsen Chavoshi (1979-)
Mohsen Ebrahimzadeh (1987-)
Mohsen Yeganeh (1985-)
Morteza Ahmadi (1924-2014)
Morteza Pashaei (1984-2014)
Mohammad Motamedi (1978-)
Monir Vakili (1923-1983)
Mozhdah Jamalzadah (1982-)

N
Nazanin AfshinJam (1979-)
Nematollah Aghasi (1939-2005)

P

Parisa (1950-)
Pari Zanganeh (1939-)
Pooran (1934-1990)
Pyruz (1962-)

R
Reza Rooygari (1946-)
Reza Sadeghi (1979-)
Reza Yazdani (1973-)

S
Saaren (2000-)
Sattar (1949-)
Shadmehr Aghili (1973-)
Shahram Shabpareh (1948-)
Shahrum Kashani (1974-2021)
Siavash Ghomayshi (1945-)
Shahram BozorgMehr (1983-)
Sima Bina (1945-)
Soroush Lashkary (1985-)
Shahkar Bineshpajooh (1972-)
Sahar Ajdamsani (1996-)
Shakila (1962-)
Salome MC (1985-)
Sirvan Khosravi (1982-)
Shusha Guppy (1935-2008)
Siavash Shams (1963-)
Sami Beigi (1982-)
Shahin Najafi (1980-)

T
Tara Tiba

V
Viguen (1929-2003)

X
Xaniar Khosravi

Y
Yaser Bakhtiari

Singers

Iranian